Sampension is a manager of industry-wide pension schemes for white collar employees in the Danish municipalities (kommuner) and central government.

Building
Sampension is headquartered in Tuborg Havn in Hellerup, just north of central Copenhagen. The building was completed in 2003 to a design by 3XN. It received a RIBA European Award from the Royal Institute of British Architects in 2005.

Schemes
A subsidiary of Kommunernes Pensionsforsikring A/S, it manages the three pension schemes Kommunernes Pensionsforsikring, StK:Pension ad Grafisk Pension. It is the third largest manager of pension schemes in Denmark with approximately EUR 27 billion under its management.

References

External links
 Official website

Institutional investors
Commercial buildings in Copenhagen
Office buildings completed in 2003